Atlantilux ampla is a species of sea snail, a marine gastropod mollusk, in the family Costellariidae, the ribbed miters.

Distribution
This species occurs in the following locations:
 The Bahamas
 Grenada

References

Costellariidae